Frederick North DL, JP (2 July 1800, Hastings – 29 October 1869), was a British Liberal politician.

Background and education
A member of the North family headed by the Earl of Guilford, Frederick North was the son of Francis Frederick North, great-grandson of the Hon. Roger North, younger son of Dudley North, 4th Baron North. Roger North's elder brother Francis North, 1st Baron Guilford was the great-grandfather of Prime Minister Lord North. Frederick North's mother was Elizabeth, daughter of Reverend William Whitear. He was educated at Harrow and St John's College, Cambridge.

Political career
North entered Parliament as one of two representatives for Hastings in 1831, a seat he held until 1835 and again between 1854 and 1865 and 1868 and 1869. He was also a Deputy Lieutenant and Justice of the Peace for Norfolk.

The highest point in Hastings is now named North's Seat in his honour, from which France can be seen on a clear day.

Family
North married Janet, daughter of Sir John Marjoribanks M.P., 1st Baronet of Lees in the County of Berwick, in 1825. They had several children, one of whom, Marianne, became a notable traveller and botanical illustrator. Janet died in January 1855. North remained a widower until his death in October 1869, aged 69.

He was the grandfather of Katharine Furse, the inaugural Director of the Women's Royal Naval Service.

References

External links 
 

1800 births
1869 deaths
Deputy Lieutenants of Norfolk
Liberal Party (UK) MPs for English constituencies
UK MPs 1831–1832
UK MPs 1832–1835
UK MPs 1835–1837
UK MPs 1852–1857
UK MPs 1857–1859
UK MPs 1859–1865
UK MPs 1868–1874
Frederick
People educated at Harrow School
Alumni of St John's College, Cambridge